The Hypnotist is a 2012 Swedish crime thriller film directed by Lasse Hallström, based on the Swedish novel of the same name by Lars Kepler. The film was selected as the Swedish entry for the Best Foreign Language Oscar at the 85th Academy Awards, but it did not make the final shortlist.

Plot
To apprehend a killer who has executed a whole family except for sole survivor Josef, Detective Joona seeks help from Dr. Erik, a specialist in acute trauma and hypnotism, to obtain case details from Josef, who is comatose. Erik is an insomniac, who takes heavy sleeping pills and has marital troubles. Although he is suspended from practice, he tries to help but pulls back after seeing discomfort in Josef. Later Erik's son Benjamin is kidnapped by someone who drugged both his wife and son, leaving threatening notes behind for Erik to stop hypnotizing. In search of his son, Erik hypnotizes Josef and discovers that he was the killer and acted under the influence and instructions of his birth mother. By way of hypnotizing his wife, Erik then figures out that Josef's mother is Lydia, a nurse who looked after him at the hospital. Joona learns she is mentally unstable and that she is Benjamin's kidnapper, and later uncovers the location of the house where she is staying with Benjamin. They go there to retrieve him and arrest Lydia. Lydia, who thinks Benjamin is her son Josef and the policemen have come to take away her child, fires her weapon and tries to escape with Benjamin in her school bus. In panic she drives her van onto thin ice over a frozen lake. Joona manages to save Benjamin, but Lydia drowns. On Christmas Day, Erik and his family eat out happily and Joona visits his female partner at home.

Cast
 Tobias Zilliacus as Joona Linna
 Mikael Persbrandt as Erik Maria Bark
 Lena Olin as Simone Bark
 Helena af Sandeberg as Daniella
 Jonatan Bökman as Josef
 Oscar Pettersson as Benjamin
 Eva Melander as Magdalena
 Anna Azcarate as Lydia
 Johan Hallström as Erland
 Göran Thorell as Stensund

See also
 List of submissions to the 85th Academy Awards for Best Foreign Language Film
 List of Swedish submissions for the Academy Award for Best Foreign Language Film

References

External links
 
 
 

2012 films
2012 crime thriller films
Swedish crime thriller films
2010s Swedish-language films
Films directed by Lasse Hallström
Films about hypnosis
2010s Swedish films